The Cathedral of Saints Peter and Paul - situated in Douala, Cameroon - is the cathedral of the Roman Catholic Archdiocese of Douala and dedicated to St Peter and St Paul.

History 
The Cathedral of St Peter and St Paul was built in 1936 by French Spiritans fathers and it is based on the legacy of the fathers Pallotins.

The advent of Catholicism in Cameroon has its origins in Germany through the baptism of the first Cameroonian catechumen, Andreas Kwa Mbange, on January 6, 1889. Born in 1873, he reaches the age of 14 years to learn the craft baker. He then discovers the Catholic cult in a Benedictine Monastery and asks to be baptized. Following the christening, the question of evangelization in Cameroon was discussed in Berlin and Rome. The year 1890 is decisive. In March, a decree of Pope Leo XIII creates the apostolic prefecture of Cameroon and entrusts the Pallottines Missionaries. On October 25, 1890, the father Vieter, prefect apostolic landed at Kamerunstadt (Douala), the head of a delegation of seven missionaries. The following day, October 26, 1890, he celebrates the first Catholic mass in Cameroonian land, in the Woermann factory in Bonanjo, then known as Belldorf.  But in December 1890, faced with the hostility of Protestants who want to keep the hand-setting Kamerunstadt, Catholic missionaries were forced to leave the coast. They founded the first Catholic mission in Cameroon in Marienberg (Sanaga). The local rivalries between Catholics and Protestants was also expressed about the language of instruction for denominational school, an indispensable tool for religious propaganda. 
The Pallotins leave Cameroon in the wake of the Germans after their defeat in 1914, and are replaced by French Spiritans in 1916.

Architecture 
Its columns and domes give it a Byzantine air. It also has neo-Roman architectural elements, including its porch. Two twin towers surround the central front.

See also 
 Roman Catholic Archdiocese of Douala
 Roman Catholicism in Cameroon
 List of cathedrals in Cameroon
 Pallottine mission to Kamerun

References

Further reading 
 PCathedral of Saints Peter and Paul in Douala Ville d'art et d'histoire, doual'art, Douala, 2006.

External links 

Roman Catholic churches completed in 1936
Roman Catholic cathedrals in Cameroon
Buildings and structures in Douala
20th-century Roman Catholic church buildings in Cameroon